Amanda Chu (born 8 March 1986) is a Taiwanese actress. She married  in 2011. Later that year, she won the Golden Bell Award for Best Supporting Actress.

Selected filmography
My Queen (2009)
Autumn's Concerto (2009–2010)
The Fierce Wife (2010–2011)
Borrow Your Love (2013)
Mr. Right Wanted (2014)

References

1986 births
Living people
21st-century Taiwanese actresses
Taiwanese television actresses